The 1964 NBA draft was the 18th annual draft of the National Basketball Association (NBA). The draft was held on May 4, 1964, before the 1964–65 season. In this draft, nine NBA teams took turns selecting amateur U.S. college basketball players. A player who had finished his four-year college eligibility was eligible for selection. If a player left college early, he would not be eligible for selection until his college class graduated. In each round, the teams select in reverse order of their win–loss record in the previous season. Before the draft, a team could forfeit its first-round draft pick and then select any player from within a  radius of its home arena as their territorial pick. The draft consisted of 15 rounds comprising 101 players selected.

Draft selections and draftee career notes
Walt Hazzard and George Wilson were selected before the draft as Los Angeles Lakers' and Cincinnati Royals' territorial picks respectively. Jim Barnes from Texas Western College was selected first overall by the New York Knicks. Willis Reed from Grambling College, who went on to win the Rookie of the Year Award in his first season, was selected eight overall by the New York Knicks. Reed has been inducted to the Basketball Hall of Fame as a player and was also named in the 50 Greatest Players in NBA History list announced at the league's 50th anniversary in 1996. Reed, who spent all of his 10-year playing career with the Knicks, won the NBA championships twice in 1970 and 1973. In both NBA Finals, he was named as the Finals MVP. He also won the Most Valuable Player Award in 1970 and was selected to five All-NBA Teams and seven All-Star Games. He became a head coach after ending his playing career. He coached the Knicks for two seasons and then the New Jersey Nets for two seasons.

Paul Silas, the 10th pick, won three NBA championships, two with the Boston Celtics in 1974 and 1976 and one with the Seattle SuperSonics in 1979. He also had two All-Star Game selections. After his playing career, he coached four NBA teams, most recently with the Charlotte Bobcats (now Charlotte Hornets). Jerry Sloan, the 19th pick, was selected to two All-Star Games in his playing career before becoming a head coach. He coached the Chicago Bulls for three seasons before being fired during the 1981–82 season. He then became the head coach of the Utah Jazz in 1988, the position he held until resigning in early 2011. He has been inducted to the Basketball Hall of Fame as a coach. Hazzard, 2nd pick Joe Caldwell, 4th pick Lucious Jackson and 5th pick Jeff Mullins are the only other players from this draft who have been selected to an All-Star Game. John Thompson, the 25th pick, has also been inducted to the Basketball Hall of Hame as a coach. After finishing his playing career, he became a successful college basketball head coach at Georgetown University. He coached the Georgetown Hoyas for 27 seasons, winning the National Collegiate Athletic Association (NCAA) championship in 1984 and becoming the first African American head coach to win a major collegiate championship. Aside from playing basketball, 12th pick Cotton Nash also played professional baseball in the Major League Baseball (MLB). He played baseball for three seasons in between his basketball career. He is one of only 12 athletes who have played in both NBA and MLB.

Also of note was a player who was officially undrafted in 1964 named Connie Hawkins. While a successful player overall, Hawkins during his freshman year at the University of Iowa back in 1961 was involved with a point shaving scandal. Despite never being convicted of point shaving (with the only involvement being him borrowing $200 by Jack Molinas for school expenses, which he paid back to Jack's brother, Fred Molinas, before the scandal broke out), he was officially kicked out of the team before having a chance to play due to NCAA rules and regulations at the time. Hawkins would later play with the Pittsburgh Rens of the rivaling American Basketball League and the independent Harlem Globetrotters before officially being undrafted in 1964. He became undrafted again in 1965 before being permanently banned from the NBA altogether in 1966. However, Hawkins would sue the NBA for $6 million in damages to his reputation, saying the league banned him unfairly and that they had no substantial evidence linking him to the point shaving scandal of that time. Eventually, the league settled with Hawkins by paying him a settlement of $1.3 million and assigning him to the Phoenix Suns in 1969, effectively removing his permanent ban. While he would only play in the NBA for seven seasons afterwards, his number would be retired by the Suns on November 19, 1976 before being in the Naismith Basketball Hall of Fame in 1992.

Key

Draft

Other picks

The following list includes other draft picks who have appeared in at least one NBA game.

Notable undrafted players
These players were not selected in the 1964 draft but played at least one game in the NBA.

Trades
 On October 18, 1963, the New York Knicks acquired a second-round pick from the St. Louis Hawks in exchange for Richie Guerin. The Knicks used the pick to draft Howard Komives.

Notes

See also
 List of first overall NBA draft picks

References
General

Specific

External links
NBA.com
NBA.com: NBA Draft History

Draft
National Basketball Association draft
NBA draft
NBA draft
Basketball in New York City
Sporting events in New York City